Paracossus zyaung is a moth in the family Cossidae. It is found in Vietnam.

References

Natural History Museum Lepidoptera generic names catalog

Cossinae
Moths of Asia
Endemic fauna of Vietnam